Pittock may refer to:

 Pittock Block, a building in downtown Portland, Oregon, U.S.
 Pittock Dam, a dam in Woodstock, Ontario, Canada
 Pittock House, a house in Camas, Washington, U.S.
 Pittock Mansion, a French Renaissance-style "château" in Portland, Oregon, U.S.
 Markle-Pittock House, a house in southwest Portland, Oregon, U.S.

People with the surname
 Amelia Pittock (born 1983), professional Australian squash player
 Georgiana Burton Pittock (1845–1918), pioneer and community leader in Portland, Oregon, U.S.
 Gordon Pittock (1909–1983), Canadian politician
 Henry Pittock (1835–1919), American pioneer, newspaper editor, publisher, and wood and paper magnate
 Murray Pittock (born 1962), Scottish historian

See also
 Pidcock (disambiguation)
 Pitcock (disambiguation)